José Francisco da Terra Brum (10 March 1776 – 22 January 1842) was a merchant, winegrower, and the first Baron of Alagoa on the island of Faial in the Portuguese archipelago of the Azores.

Biography
José Francisco da Terra Brum was born on 10 March 1776 on Faial Island. His parents were Francisco Inácio Brum Terra and Joaquina Clara de Noronha. His maternal grandparents were João Inácio Homem da Costa Noronha—a wealthy landowner, farmer, and soldier from an illustrious Angra do Heroísmo family—and Clara Mariana Xavier de Noronha Côrte-Real.

During his life Terra Brum became one of Faial's largest landowners. As titleholder to landed estates, he was known as a morgado. His properties were situated along the Ribeira da Conceição (literally, Stream of the Immaculate Conception) and the so-called Alagoa coastline in what were then the outskirts of the city of Horta, Faial. He also owned and maintained winegrowing properties on neighboring Pico Island, where he was one of the largest producers of Verdelho wine.

Throughout his life he served in various of the Kingdom of Portugal's public positions, including lieutenant colonel of local militias, knight of the Portuguese Military Order of Christ, knight of the Royal House of Portugal from 30 April 1794 onward, Captain-Mor of Faial from 14 March 1818 onward, and as a fidalgo of the Portuguese monarchy's privy council from January 1834 onward. On 22 December 1841, Queen Maria II of Portugal decreed Terra Brum the first Baron of Alagoa, creating the title in his favor.

Family
José Francisco's ancestors the Terras and Brums were considered some of Faial's oldest and most illustrious families. José Francisco married Francisca Paula Brum e Silveira, whose ancestors the Silveiras were also key members of Faial's landed gentry. 
 
Following José Francisco's death on 22 January 1842, his eldest son José Francisco da Terra Brum II became the second Baron of Alagoa. The second Terra Brum died in 1844, extinguishing the title. In 1901, King Carlos I of Portugal reinstated the baronage in favor of Manuel Maria da Terra Brum, José Francisco da Terra Brum's youngest son, and like his father before him one of Pico's largest winegrowers and a prominent public figure on both sides of the Faial-Pico Channel.

References

Notes

Sources

Terra Brum
People from Faial Island
Azorean nobility
1776 births
1842 deaths
Portuguese nobility